USS Wahoo (SSN-806), a Block 5  for the United States Navy, will be the fifth United States Navy vessel named for the wahoo. It was ordered on 2 December 2019. Secretary of the Navy Kenneth Braithwaite officially announced the name on 17 November 2020, in a press release.

References
 

 

Virginia-class submarines
Submarines of the United States Navy
Proposed ships of the United States Navy